Sphaerium rhomboideum, the rhomboid fingernailclam, is a species of freshwater clams in the family Sphaeriidae. It is found in North America.

References

External links 

 
 Sphaerium rhomboideum at mussel-project.uwsp.edu

rhomboideum
Bivalves described in 1822